Yabalakovo (Yabalaq) is a rural locality (a selo) and the administrative centre of Yabalakovsky Selsoviet, Ilishevsky District, Bashkortostan, Russia. The population was 359 as of 2010. There are 5 streets.

Geography 
Yabalakovo is located 39 km north of Verkhneyarkeyevo (the district's administrative centre) by road. Verkhneye Yuldashevo is the nearest rural locality.

References 

Rural localities in Ilishevsky District